BMO may refer to:
Bank of Montreal, a Canadian bank
BMO USA, an American subsidiary of the Bank of Montreal
Balkan Mathematical Olympiad, an international contest for students from European countries
British Mathematical Olympiad, part of the selection process for the UK International Mathematical Olympiad team
Bloody Mannequin Orchestra, a 1980s punk band from Bethesda, Maryland
Bounded mean oscillation, in harmonic analysis, a real-valued function whose mean oscillation is bounded
BMO, National Rail station code for Birmingham Moor Street railway station in Birmingham, UK
BMO (pronounced "Beemo"), a character in the animated television series Adventure Time
BMO Field, a stadium located in Toronto, Canada
 BMO, before (stock) market open, usually in reference to the time of an upcoming announcement, such as an earnings report